

A

B

C

D

E

F

G

H

I

J

K

L

M

O

P

R

S

T

W

References

Roads in Howard County, Maryland
Howard